Whitaker House is a historic home located at Benton in Yates County, New York. It is a Late Gothic Revival style structure built about 1850.

It was listed on the National Register of Historic Places in 1994.

References

Houses on the National Register of Historic Places in New York (state)
Gothic Revival architecture in New York (state)
Houses completed in the 19th century
Houses in Yates County, New York
National Register of Historic Places in Yates County, New York